Jonas Sees in Color is the debut album by American rock band Jonas Sees in Color, released on September 29, 2009 by Glassnote Records. It was produced by Aaron Johnson at Candyland Studios in Denver, Colorado, the same studio used by The Fray to record their first two albums. The record was engineered by Warren Huart.

Track listing

B-sides
While in the studio, Jonas Sees in Color recorded other songs which weren't put on the album. These songs include "South is Home" and an alternative version of "Sky Keeps Falling" which was piano-only.

Personnel
Jonas Sees in Color
Ryan Downing – Vocals, lyrics
Jonathan Owens – Guitar
Jonathan Albright - Guitar
Mikey Deming - Bass
Meagan Beth Plummer - Piano
John Chester – Drums and percussion

References

2009 debut albums
Jonas Sees in Color albums
Glassnote Records albums